Tracey Gold (born May 16, 1969) is an American actress and former child star known for playing Carol Seaver on the 1980s sitcom Growing Pains.

Acting career
Tracey Gold became an actress at the age of four, first appearing in a Pepsi print ad. She appeared in two canceled series, Shirley with Shirley Jones in 1979, and Goodnight Beantown, starring Bill Bixby in 1983. Gold was originally cast as the youngest daughter in the original pilot series of the sitcom Gimme A Break! starring Nell Carter, but was replaced by actress Lara Jill Miller when the show went to series. She played one of Albert Finney and Diane Keaton's four daughters in the feature film Shoot the Moon (1982). Gold also guest starred on her sister Missy Gold's series Benson in 1985, playing the cousin of Missy's character, Katie Gatling.

In 1985, Gold auditioned for the role of Carol Seaver on Growing Pains, but was not initially cast. The actress chosen for the pilot was Elizabeth Ward, who had starred alongside Gold in The Hand-Me-Down Kid, a 1983 ABC Afterschool Special. However, test audiences did not favor Ward in the role of Carol, and she was replaced by Gold. Growing Pains ran from 1985 until 1992. During this time, Gold became a famous teen star and battled anorexia. In 1988, Gold also starred as Angela Strull in the teen film Dance 'til Dawn.

On August 9, 1988, Gold and her two sisters were the only celebrities at the funeral of murdered child-actor Judith Barsi. Gold read A Child Of Mine (from the poet Edgar Albert Guest) as a eulogy. 

After the end of the series, Gold continued to work as an actress. Over the next decade, she starred in several television movies. In 2003, Gold appeared in an episode of the TV show The Dead Zone as the character Penny Barton. Gold was a contestant on the program Celebrity Mole: Yucatán in 2004, and starred in the movie Safe Harbor in 2006. She hosted the TV Guide Channel mini-show Trapped in TV Guide. In addition, she hosted the TLC series The Secret Life of a Soccer Mom, which debuted on March 3, 2008. Gold appeared as the spokesperson in "Baby Sleeps Safe", a national television infomercial for Baby Guardian. On January 2, 2012, she appeared on the ABC network's reality series, Celebrity Wife Swap, trading places with singer Carnie Wilson for a week. On July 24, 2013, Gold returned to sitcoms with an appearance on the Melissa & Joey episode, "Something Happened," as one half of a lesbian couple with a home-schooled daughter. Gold starred in the first episode of Heartbreakers called "Shot Through The Heart" on ID on August 13, 2014. 

She competed on and won the twenty-fourth season of Worst Cooks in America, the show's seventh celebrity edition titled That's So 90s, airing in April and May 2022.

Battle with anorexia 

Gold stated that starting at about the age of seven, she thought about dieting, having learned the word and the concept on the many television production sets she worked on as a child actress. She became preoccupied with the television movie The Best Little Girl in the World, starring actress Jennifer Jason Leigh, about an anorexic teenager. In her autobiography, Gold says that in an attempt to control her development into a woman, she began restricting what she ate. When she was 11, she was diagnosed with the early stages of anorexia nervosa by her family pediatrician after a weight loss that accompanied a growth spurt. After some counseling, she eventually returned to a more normal weight for most of her teenage years. In 1988 at age 19, Gold gained some weight over the Growing Pains series hiatus. That season, the sitcom's scripts called for her to be the brunt of jokes about her being overweight from her television brothers for many episodes in a row.

Beginning in October 1988, Gold dieted from 133 pounds to about 110 pounds on a medically supervised  diet, but still occasionally the scripts continued to include weight-based jokes at her expense. In her autobiography, she says that between 1989 and 1991, she became increasingly obsessed with food and her weight and continued to slowly and steadily lose weight. 

In 1990, Gold began group therapy in an eating disorder program, but only learned more ways to lose weight. That season, her problem with weight loss was touched upon slightly on her television series, when Gold is seen looking at her body in a carnival mirror, and describes to another character the distorted image in her head.

In 1991, she started starving herself more than ever and vomiting, and lost a massive amount of weight, to the point that she was admitted to a hospital in early 1992. Her lowest weight is estimated to have been near 80 pounds. She was suspended from the show for her skeletal appearance. Photos of Gold's emaciated body were plastered all over tabloid magazines, and she was one of the first celebrities ever to be formally outed for anorexia. She last appeared in the 1991 episode, "Menage a Luke" after missing the two prior episodes where her problem is very obvious in some scenes, and did not return until the last two episodes of the series in the late spring of 1992, although she was not nearly recovered at this point.

After a several year struggle, Gold eventually recovered, and starred in the television movie For the Love of Nancy (1994) with Jill Clayburgh. The film explored a young woman's battle with anorexia and its effects on her family. Although she was warned of the possibility that she had done damage to her reproductive organs by the years of anorexia, Gold was able to give birth to four children. 

As she entered her thirties, Gold maintained a normal weight for her body structure, and often holds speaking engagements warning young women about the dangers of eating disorders, while continuing work as an actress.

Personal life 
Gold met her husband Roby Marshall through Growing Pains co-star Joanna Kerns. Marshall served as a consultant on the true-crime miniseries  Blind Faith, about the 1984 contract killing of Roby’s mother, Maria, arranged by Roby’s father, Robert. Kern portrayed Maria in the miniseries.

Gold and Marshall married on October 8, 1994, and have four sons, Sage Gold, Bailey Vincent, Aiden Michael, and Dylan Christopher.

In 2003, Gold wrote the book Room to Grow: An Appetite for Life with Julie McCarron, about Gold's struggle with and eventual recovery from anorexia.

Arrest

In 2004, Gold was arrested for drunk driving after rolling her SUV down a California freeway embankment. Gold was arrested by California Highway Patrol officers and charged with a felony count of driving under the influence causing injury. 

While Gold's husband and two of her sons (ages five and five months) were not seriously injured in the late-night crash, the actress's oldest child, 7-year-old Sage, suffered a broken clavicle and a head laceration. 

After CHP officers administered sobriety tests, Gold was arrested on the DUI charge, said CHP spokesman Steve Reid. Booked under her married name, Tracey Gold Marshall, she spent five hours in the Ventura lockup before being released on $50,000 bail. She eventually pleaded guilty and was sentenced to one month work release, 240 hours of community service, and 3 years of probation.

Filmography

References

External links
 
 
 
 

1969 births
20th-century American actresses
21st-century American actresses
Actresses from California
Actresses from New York City
American adoptees
American child actresses
American film actresses
American television actresses
Living people
Participants in American reality television series
People from New York City
People from Greater Los Angeles